
Year 152 BC was a year of the pre-Julian Roman calendar. At the time it was known as the Year of the Consulship of Marcellus and Flaccus (or, less frequently, year 602 Ab urbe condita). The denomination 152 BC for this year has been used since the early medieval period, when the Anno Domini calendar era became the prevalent method in Europe for naming years.

Events 
 By place 

 Seleucid Empire 
 The pretender to the Seleucid throne, Alexander Balas, makes contact with Jonathan Maccabeus offering him terms even more favorable than those offered by the king Demetrius I Soter. In particular, Alexander offers him the official appointment as High Priest in Jerusalem. In response, Jonathan withdraws his support from Demetrius and declares his allegiance to Alexander. Thus Jonathan becomes the first member of his family to achieve appointment as High Priest.

Deaths 
 Marcus Aemilius Lepidus, Roman statesman, consul, Pontifex Maximus and censor; as a praetor, he has been governor of Sicily in 191 BC
 Marcus Porcius Cato Licinianus, Roman jurist, son of Cato the Elder by his first wife, Licinia
 Zhang Cang, Chinese scholar, general and prime-minister (b. 253 BC)

References